Medbowli is a village in Ranga Reddy district in Telangana, India. It falls under Saroornagar mandal.

References

Villages in Ranga Reddy district